Kings of Mulberry Street is a 2019 South African comedy-drama film produced written and directed by Judy Naidoo. The film stars Aaqil Hoosen, Amith Sing, Rizelle Januk and Neville Pillay in the lead roles while Keshan Chetty, Chris Forrest, Kogie Naidoo and Thiru Naidoo play supportive roles. The film is distributed by Indigenous Film Distribution in association with Nickelodeon and Comedy Central. The theme of the film relates to the classic 1980s of Bollywood cinema in India. The film had its theatrical release in South Africa on 28 June 2019 and received positive reviews from the critics. The film has also been selected to be screened at few international film festivals notably at the 24th Schlingel International Film Festival and in the St. Louis Film Festival.

Cast 

 Aaqil Hoosen as Ticky Chetty
 Shaan Nathaoo as Harold Singh
 Amith Sing as Dev Singh
 Neville Pillay as Raja
 Keshan Chetty as Size
 Chris Forrest as Mr. White
 Rizelle Januk as Charmaine Chetty
 Thiru Naidoo as Reggie Chetty
 Kogie Naidoo as Granny Chetty
 Kimberly Arthur as Leila

Synopsis 
Set in the fictionalised Sugarhill District in early 1980s, the storyline of the film revolves around the adventures of two young Indian boys who have to desperately find a way somehow to overcome the challenges and obstacles in order to defeat the bullying local crime landlord who is threatening their families.

Production 
The portions of the film were mostly shot in Verulam and Tongaat which are located in KwaZulu Natal. The official theatrical trailer of the film was unveiled on 16 June 2019.

References

External links 
 

2019 films
2019 comedy-drama films
South African comedy-drama films
South African Indian films
2010s English-language films
English-language South African films